The Recopa Sul-Brasileira was a Brazilian football competition reuniting the champions of four other competitions, which are the Copa FPF, the Copa Paraná, the Copa Santa Catarina and the Copa FGF, respectively played by teams of São Paulo, Paraná, Santa Catarina and Rio Grande do Sul. It was officially recognized by the Brazilian Football Confederation. The competition's first edition was played in 2007.

Format
Starting in 2007, the competition was played by four teams in two stages, the first being the semifinals, and the second being the final, played by the semifinals winners. Every year, one of the four participating states hosts the competition.

Participating teams

2007

In 2007, the following teams participated of the competition:

2008

In 2008, the following teams participated of the competition:

2009

In 2009, the following teams participated of the competition:

2010

In 2010, the following teams participated of the competition:

List of champions

Statistics

By team

By state

References

 
Defunct football cup competitions in Brazil
Defunct football competitions in Brazil